Annie Rudman (23 March 1844 – 15 August 1928) was a notable New Zealand Salvation Army officer and social worker. She was born at Bedwell Park, near Essendon, Hertfordshire, England, in 1844.

References

1844 births
1928 deaths
New Zealand social workers
New Zealand Salvationists
English emigrants to New Zealand
19th-century New Zealand people
People from Welwyn Hatfield (district)